Boone Township is an inactive township in Crawford County, in the U.S. state of Missouri.

Boone Township was established in 1848, most likely taking its name from Boone Creek.

References

Townships in Missouri
Townships in Crawford County, Missouri